Joe Taimanglo (born June 27, 1984) is a Guamanian professional mixed martial artist of Chamorro ethnicity who competes in Bellator's Bantamweight division. A professional competitor since 2004, Taimanglo has also formerly competed for Pacific Xtreme Combat and DEEP.

Background
Born and raised in Yona, Guam, Taimanglo competed in football, and was talented, competing at the professional level on his Island and won Defensive Player of the Year honors in 2004.

Mixed martial arts career

Pacific Xtreme Combat
Taimanglo started his professional career in 2004. He fought mainly for Guam-based promotion Pacific Xtreme Combat.

Taimanglo faced Harris Sarmiento on October 29, 2011 at PXC 27 for the vacant featherweight title. He defeated Sarmiento after five rounds and became the new PXC featherweight champion.

Taimanglo faced Jang Yong Kim on July 28, 2012 at PXC 32. He won via TKO early in the first round and retained his title.

In 2013, with a record of 17–4–1, Taimanglo signed with Bellator.

Bellator MMA
Taimanglo was scheduled to make his promotional debut against Shah Bobonis on March 28, 2013 at Bellator 94. However, Bobonis had problems in making weight and was replaced by Ronnie Rogers. Taimanglo won via submission due to a north-south choke in the second round.

Taimanglo faced Andrew Fisher on September 13, 2013 at Bellator 99 in the quarterfinal match of Bellator season nine featherweight tournament. He won via unanimous decision (29-28, 29-28, 29-28) and advanced to the semifinals.

Taimanglo then faced Justin Wilcox in the semifinals on October 11, 2013 at Bellator 103. He lost the fight via unanimous decision (30-27, 30-27, 29-28).

Taimanglo then faced Rob Emerson on April 11, 2014 at Bellator 116. He lost the fight via unanimous decision.

Taimanglo faced Michael Parker on September 26, 2014 at Bellator 126. He won the fight via unanimous decision.

Taimanglo faced Antonio Duarte at Bellator 137 on May 15, 2015. He won the fight via knockout in the third round.

In his most anticipated bout to date he faced Darrion Caldwell in an expected bantamweight title eliminator fight until Taimanglo missed weight. He went on to submit Caldwell just nine seconds into the third round with a guillotine choke.

Taimanglo and Caldwell had a rematch in the main event at Bellator 167 on December 3, 2016. This time Caldwell managed to keep Taimanglo down and avoid all of Taimanglo's submission attempts, resulting in a unanimous decision loss for Taimanglo.

Taimanglo was expected to face Steve Garcia at Bellator 174 on March 3, 2017. However, the bout was removed from the fight card after Taimanglo missed weight.

Taimanglo faced Leandro Higo at Bellator 184 on October 6, 2017. He lost the fight via unanimous decision.

Taimanglo faced Joe Warren at Bellator 195 on March 2, 2018. He won the fight via split decision.

Taimanglo retired in the August of 2018, only to return to competition against Abdul-Rakhman Dudaev at WFCA 54 on November 16, 2018. He lost the fight via unanimous decision.

Personal life
On October 22, 2020, Taimanglo was stopped by a police patrol while he was driving a scooter with expired plates. Subsequently, the police found a loaded gun, drug paraphernalia and methamphetamine from Taimanglo's possession. He was arrested and charged with three third-degree felonies.

Championships and accomplishments

Mixed martial arts
MMAjunkie
July 2016 Submission of the Month: vs. Darrion Caldwell on July 22
Pacific Xtreme Combat
PXC Featherweight Championship (One time)
One successful title defense

Grappling
Pan Asian Grappling Tournament
No-gi Most Technical Fighter (2006–07)

Mixed martial arts record

|-
| Loss
| align=center| 24–9–1
| Abdul-Rakhman Dudaev
| Decision (unanimous)
| WCFA 54: Dudaev vs. Taimanglo
| 
| align=center| 3
| align=center| 5:00
| Isa Town, Bahrain
| 
|-
| Win
| align=center | 24–8–1
| Joe Warren
| Decision (split)
| Bellator 195
| 
| align=center | 3
| align=center | 5:00
| Thackerville, Oklahoma, United States
| 
|-
| Loss
| align=center| 23–8–1
| Leandro Higo
| Decision (unanimous)
| Bellator 184
| 
| align=center| 3
| align=center| 5:00
| Thackerville, Oklahoma, United States
| 
|-
| Loss
| align=center| 23–7–1
| Darrion Caldwell
| Decision (unanimous)
| Bellator 167
| 
| align=center| 3
| align=center| 5:00
| Thackerville, Oklahoma, United States
| 
|-
| Win
| align=center| 23–6–1
| Darrion Caldwell
| Submission (guillotine choke)
| Bellator 159
| 
| align=center| 3
| align=center| 0:09
| Mulvane, Kansas, United States
| 
|-
| Win
| align=center| 22–6–1
| Sirwan Kakai
| Decision (unanimous)
| Bellator 151
| 
| align=center| 3
| align=center| 5:00
| Thackerville, Oklahoma, United States
| 
|-
| Win
| align=center| 21–6–1
| Antonio Duarte
| KO (anchor punch)
| Bellator 137
| 
| align=center| 3
| align=center| 1:00
| Temecula, California, United States
|
|-
| Win
| align=center| 20–6–1
| Michael Parker
| Decision (unanimous)
| Bellator 126
| 
| align=center| 3
| align=center| 5:00
| Phoenix, Arizona, United States
| 
|-
| Loss
| align=center| 19–6–1
| Rob Emerson
| Decision (unanimous)
| Bellator 116
| 
| align=center| 3
| align=center| 5:00
| Temecula, California, United States
| 
|-
| Loss
| align=center| 19–5–1
| Justin Wilcox 
| Decision (unanimous)
| Bellator 103
| 
| align=center| 3
| align=center| 5:00
| Mulvane, Kansas, United States
| 
|-
| Win
| align=center| 19–4–1
| Andrew Fisher
| Decision (unanimous)
| Bellator 99
| 
| align=center| 3
| align=center| 5:00
| Temecula, California, United States
| 
|-
| Win
| align=center| 18–4–1
| Ronnie Rogers
| Submission (north-south choke)
| Bellator 94
| 
| align=center| 2
| align=center| 0:33
| Tampa, Florida, United States
| 
|-
| Win
| align=center| 17–4–1
| Jang Yong Kim
| TKO (punches)
| PXC: Pacific Xtreme Combat 32
| 
| align=center| 1
| align=center| 0:40
| Mangilao, Guam, United States
| 
|-
| Win
| align=center| 16–4–1
| Harris Sarmiento
| Decision (unanimous)
| PXC: Pacific Xtreme Combat 27
| 
| align=center| 5
| align=center| 5:00
| Mangilao, Guam, United States
| 
|-
| Win
| align=center| 15–4–1
| Young Jun Kim
| Submission (rear-naked choke)
| PXC: Pacific Xtreme Combat 24
| 
| align=center| 1
| align=center| 1:23
| Manila, Metro Manila, Philippines
| 
|-
| Win
| align=center| 14–4–1
| Travis Beyer
| Submission (kneebar)
| PXC: Pacific Xtreme Combat 22
| 
| align=center| 2
| align=center| 0:28
| Mangilao, Guam, United States
| 
|-
| Win
| align=center| 13–4–1
| Yong Nam Gu
| Submission (arm-triangle choke)
| PXC: Pacific Xtreme Combat 20
| 
| align=center| 1
| align=center| 1:30
| Mangilao, Guam, United States
| 
|-
| Win
| align=center| 12–4–1
| Chan Ho Bae
| Submission (arm-triangle choke)
| PXC 19: Nineteen
| 
| align=center| 3
| align=center| N/A
| Mangilao, Guam, United States
| 
|-
| Win
| align=center| 11–4–1
| Per Eklund
| Submission (D'Arce choke)
| PRO Fighting 3: Destiny vs. Demons
| 
| align=center| 1
| align=center| 1:36
| Taipei, Taiwan
| 
|-
| Win
| align=center| 
| Alex Castro
| Decision (unanimous)
| PXC 18: Dead Game 2
| 
| align=center| 3
| align=center| 5:00
| Mangilao, Guam, United States
| 
|-
| Loss
| align=center| 9–4–1
| Toshiaki Kitada
| Submission (guillotine choke)
| Deep: 41 Impact
| 
| align=center| 1
| align=center| 1:29
| Tokyo, Japan
| 
|-
| Loss
| align=center| 9–3–1
| Tomonori Taniguchi
| Submission (guillotine choke)
| PXC 16: The Beatdown
| 
| align=center| 2
| align=center| N/A
| Mangilao, Guam, United States
| 
|-
| Win
| align=center| 9–2–1
| Alex Castro
| Submission (rear-naked choke)
| PXC 15: Dead Game
| 
| align=center| 3
| align=center| N/A
| Mangilao, Guam, United States
| 
|-
| Win
| align=center| 8–2–1
| Colin MacKenzie
| TKO (punches)
| PXC 14: Evolution
| 
| align=center| 1
| align=center| N/A
| Mangilao, Guam, United States
| 
|-
| Win
| align=center| 7–2–1
| Derrick Rangamar
| Submission (rear-naked choke)
| PXC 13: Back from the Dead
| 
| align=center| 2
| align=center| N/A
| Mangilao, Guam, United States
| 
|-
| Loss
| align=center| 6–2–1
| Maurice Eazel
| KO (punches) 
| PXC 11: No Turning Back
| 
| align=center| 1
| align=center| N/A
| Mangilao, Guam, United States
| 
|-
| Draw
| align=center| 6–1–1
| Jimmy Jarquin
| Draw
| PXC 10: Final Redemption
| 
| align=center| 3
| align=center| 5:00
| Mangilao, Guam, United States
| 
|-
| Win
| align=center| 6–1
| Sourikone Nhinsavath
| Decision (unanimous)
| PXC 9: Grand Prix
| 
| align=center| 3
| align=center| 5:00
| Mangilao, Guam, United States
| 
|-
| Win
| align=center| 5–1
| Albert Manners
| Submission (rear-naked choke)
| PXC 8: Terror Dome
| 
| align=center| 1
| align=center| N/A
| Mangilao, Guam, United States
| 
|-
| Win
| align=center| 4–1
| Chico Cantiberos
| Submission (triangle choke)
| PXC 7: Eruption
| 
| align=center| 1
| align=center| N/A
| Mangilao, Guam, United States
| 
|-
| Win
| align=center| 3–1
| Matt Manibusan
| Submission (choke) 
| PXC 6: Tempun Gura
| 
| align=center| 1
| align=center| N/A
| Mangilao, Guam, United States
| 
|-
| Win
| align=center| 2–1
| Ray Quidachay
| TKO (punches) 
| PXC 4: Gera
| 
| align=center| 1
| align=center| 1:31
| Mangilao, Guam, United States
| 
|-
| Loss
| align=center| 1–1
| Justin Guzman
| TKO (punches)
| PXC 3: Return of the Enforcer
| 
| align=center| 2
| align=center| 4:49
| Mangilao, Guam, United States
| 
|-
| Win
| align=center| 1–0
| T.B. Hardison
| TKO (punches)
| FFCF Islands: Tinian
| 
| align=center| 3
| align=center| N/A
| Tinian, Northern Mariana Islands, United States
|

References

1984 births
Living people
Guamanian male mixed martial artists
Bantamweight mixed martial artists
Featherweight mixed martial artists
Mixed martial artists utilizing Brazilian jiu-jitsu
American practitioners of Brazilian jiu-jitsu
Chamorro people